Jana Shiha (born 22 August 2001 in Alexandria) is an Egyptian professional squash player. As of February 2018, she was ranked number 87 in the world. Now, October 2022, she is ranked 1st in the world. Jana is known for being a competitive, committed, and honest player. She won the 2019 CIB El Shams Tour 1 tournament.

References

2001 births
Living people
Egyptian female squash players
21st-century Egyptian women